Jason Hirata (born 1986, Seattle, WA) is an artist who has shown internationally. He lives and works in New York.

Life and education 
Hirata was born in 1986. He received a BFA in photography from the University of Washington in 2009. In 2015 he received the Brink Prize for emerging artists working in the Cascadia region.

In addition to making his own artwork, Hirata works as a videographer for other artists.

Exhibitions 
Hirata was included in an exhibition at Artists' Space in 2020 where his work was unfavorably reviewed as a "slacker gesture". He had a solo show at 80WSE gallery in New York City in 2020 that consisted of work by Hannah Black, Adjua Greaves, Trajal Harrell, New Red Order & Jim Fletcherm Carissa Rodriguez and Hito Steyerl that Hirata had worked on and documentation of those artworks. Hirata considers the conveyance of the experience of being in the exhibition the work itself. Hirata has also shown at Svetlana, New York (2019); Veronica Project Space, Seattle (2019); Kunstverein Nuremberg (2019); Henry Art Gallery, Seattle (2016); and Muscle Beach, Portland (2016). He has also shown at Calicoon Fine Arts.

Collaborators 
Hirata frequently works collaboratively with other artists. These artists include Levi Easterbrooks, Carissa Rodriguez, Hannah Black, Hito Steyerl, New Red Order.

References 

1986 births
Living people
American artists